The hybrid elm cultivar Ulmus × hollandica 'Belgica', one of a number of hybrids arising from the crossing of Wych Elm (Ulmus glabra) with a variety of Field Elm (Ulmus minor), was reputedly raised in the nurseries of the Abbey of the Dunes (Abdij Ten Duinen), Veurne (later removed to Bruges), in 1694. Popular throughout Belgium and the Netherlands in the 19th century both as an ornamental and as a shelter-belt tree, it was the 'Hollandse iep' (:'Dutch elm') in these countries, as distinct from the tree known as 'Dutch Elm' in Great Britain and Ireland since the 17th century: Ulmus × hollandica 'Major'. In Francophone Belgium it was known as orme gras de Malines.

'Belgica' arose in the same hybridization zone that produced 'Ypreau' (possibly synonymous with 'Major'), 'Klemmer' and 'Dumont', among other elm cultivars.

Description
'Belgica' has a broad crown supported by a straight, rough-barked stem. Unusually thriving on poor sandy soils, it proved one of the fastest-growing elms in Europe, typically achieving heights of < 40 m. The obovate to elliptic leaves are < 12 cm long by 5 cm wide, and terminate at the apex as a long, serrated point. 'Belgica' was prized, among other reasons, for its "ease and grace of twigs and foliage".

Pests and diseases
Very susceptible to Dutch elm disease, it was the loss of this particular elm more than any other to the earlier strain of the disease which initiated the Dutch elm breeding programme in 1928. In trials of Dutch clones, past and present, conducted at Wageningen in 2008 and 2009, 'Belgica' exhibited 89% defoliation eight weeks after inoculation.'Belgica' is also very vulnerable to verticillium wilt.

Cultivation
'Belgica' was planted in great numbers along roads, streets and canals in the Netherlands, and also in squares, parks and gardens. Its popularity and its aesthetic qualities are evidenced in photographic records of the Netherlands from the late 19th century to c.1920. It is still present in there in smaller numbers. 'Belgica's "rapid growth even on poor soils and its good resistance to wind and atmospheric pollution" made it an ideal choice for shelter-belt planting.

The Späth nursery of Berlin supplied an U. montana [× hollandica] belgica to the Dominion Arboretum, Ottawa, Canada in 1896, and one to the Royal Botanic Garden Edinburgh in 1902. In the UK a 'Belgica', "Belgian Elm, a popular continental street tree", was supplied by Hillier & Sons, Winchester, Hampshire, in the mid-20th century, the nursery giving Ulmus × hollandica 'Latifolia' as a synonym. U. Belgica, 'Belgian Elm', "of rapid growth and fine spreading shape", appears from the 1870s in the catalogues of the Mount Hope Nursery (also known as Ellwanger and Barry) of Rochester, New York, and later in the catalogues of Kelsey's, New York. The cultivar has been introduced to arboreta in North America (see under Accessions). Young specimens were said to be "flourishing" in Arnold Arboretum in 1915. There is no record of its introduction to Australasia.

Notable trees
The Oudemanhuispoort 'Belgica' in Amsterdam, planted in 1895, is the largest elm in the Netherlands, with a height of 34.6 m and a girth of 4.4 m. The UK TROBI champion tree grows at Dyke Park Road in Brighton, measuring 17 m high by 92 cm d.b.h. in 2009, one of nine trees forming part of the NCCPG Collection (see under Accessions).

In art

The columnar boles, high-arching branches and graceful foliage of 'Belgica' elms ('Hollandse iepen') beside canals and streets in the Netherlands are celebrated in many of the paintings and drawings of the Dutch artist Karel Klinkenberg (1852–1924).

Synonymy
Ulmus batavina: Koch, Dendrologie; Bäume, Sträucher und Halbsträucher, welche in Mittel- und Nord- Europa im Freien kultivirt werden 2 (1): 414 1872.
Ulmus belgica: Weston, The English flora 46. 1775.
Ulmus campestris (: minor) bataviana: Simon-Louis, Metz, France. Catalogue, 1869.
Ulmus montana var. belgica: Späth list, 1902
Ulmus × hollandica var. belgica

Hybrid cultivars
'Den Haag' (Ulmus pumila × Ulmus × hollandica 'Belgica'), raised in the Netherlands in 1936.
An unnamed cultivar of the same parentage stood in Zuiderpark, The Hague, in the mid-20th century.

Varieties
Augustine Henry considered the once widely planted elm cultivar U. × hollandica 'Dumont' to be a variety of 'Belgica', calling it Ulmus belgica var. Dumontii.

Accessions
North America
Arnold Arboretum, US. Acc. no. 322–81
Longwood Gardens, US. Acc. no. 1967–0877
Morton Arboretum, US. Acc. no. 1457–24
Europe
Brighton & Hove City Council, UK. NCCPG Elm Collection. Examples planted at Dudeney Lodge, Dyke Road Park and Donald Hall Road.
Grange Farm Arboretum, Lincolnshire, UK. Acc. no. 1145.
Wijdemeren city council, Netherlands. Elm collection, five trees planted 2018 ‘s-Gravelandsevaartweg, Loosdrecht

Nurseries
Coles Nurseries , Thurnby, Leicester, UK. 
Noordplant , Glimmen, Netherlands.

References

External links
  Sheet labelled Ulmus x hollandica 'Belgica', Achterhoek, 1958
  Short shoots and samarae. Sheet labelled Ulmus x hollandica 'Belgica', Wageningen Arboretum, 1962  
  Sheet labelled Ulmus x hollandica 'Belgica', Wageningen Arboretum, 1962 
  Sheet labelled Ulmus x hollandica 'Belgica', Wageningen Arboretum, 1962
 noordplant.nl, Ulmus × hollandica 'Belgica'

Dutch elm cultivar
Ulmus articles with images
Ulmus